Sir John Etton (died 1433), of Gilling, Yorkshire, was an English Member of Parliament.

He was a Member (MP) of the Parliament of England for Yorkshire in 1411, November 1414, 1415 and December 1421. He was Sheriff of Yorkshire 22 November 1406 – 23 November 1407, 3 November 1412 – 6 November 1413.

References

14th-century births
1433 deaths
15th-century English people
People from Ryedale (district)
Members of the Parliament of England (pre-1707)